Cheirolophus is a genus of flowering plants in the family Asteraceae first described as a genus in 1827.

The genus is native to the western Mediterranean (Spain, Portugal, France, Italy, Algeria, Morocco, Malta, Canary Islands).

 Species

References

Asteraceae genera
Cynareae